Fielding Edlow is a comedian, actress, and writer who has appeared in BoJack Horseman, Get Shorty and Behind The Candelabra. She grew up in New York City and attended the Neighborhood Playhouse.

She was trained at the Upright Citizens Brigade. In 2008, she married American actor Larry Clarke and they have one daughter. Fielding created Bitter Homes and Gardens, a comedy web-series in which the couple star as a narcissistic Hollywood couple who relentlessly demean each other's careers and achievements. Fielding's half-hour comedy special, Can't Say Sl*t, is now streaming on Amazon (Comedy Dynamics). She is also an LA based playwright and her plays have been workshopped/produced at Naked Angels, Comedy Central Stage, Skylight, and Circle X Theatre

References

External links
 
 

American women comedians
Living people
Year of birth missing (living people)
American voice actresses
American stand-up comedians
21st-century American women